Aleksei Vladimirovich Botvinyev (born 25 June 1981) is a Russian football coach and a former player. He is the goalkeepers' coach with FC Khimki.

Club career

Tom Tomsk
On 26 December 2010, Botvinyev signed a three-year contract with Russian Premier League side FC Tom Tomsk.

References

External links
  Player page on the official FC Saturn Moscow Oblast website
 

1981 births
People from Kolomna
Living people
Russian footballers
Association football goalkeepers
FC Saturn Ramenskoye players
FC Kuban Krasnodar players
FC Krasnodar players
FC Tom Tomsk players
Russian Premier League players
Russian expatriate footballers
Expatriate footballers in Ukraine
Russian expatriate sportspeople in Ukraine
Russian football managers
Sportspeople from Moscow Oblast